The Vodacom Ligue 1 is the top division of the Congolese Association Football Federation, the governing body of football in the Democratic Republic of the Congo. It was created in 1958. In 2013, the highest attendance was set in the match DC Motema Pembe - AS Vita Club, which saw an attendance of 80,000 football fans at Stade des Martyrs.
TP Mazembe is the most successful club with 19 titles.

In 2010 the competition was renamed the Vodacom Super League following the signing of a five-year sponsorship deal with communications company Vodacom.

Qualification for African competitions

Association ranking for 2020–21 CAF competitions
Association ranking for 2020–21 CAF Champions League and 2020–21 CAF Confederation Cup will be based on results from each CAF tournament (Champions League and Confederation Cup) from 2016 to 2019–20.

Legend
 CL: CAF Champions League
 CC: CAF Confederation Cup

2021−22 clubs

AC Rangers (Kinshasa)
AS Dauphins Noirs (Goma)
AS Maniema Union (Kindu)
AS Kuya Sport (Kinshasa)
AS Vita Club (Kinshasa)
CS Don Bosco (Lubumbashi)
DC Motema Pembe (Kinshasa)
Etoile de Kivu (Bukavu)
FC Blessing Kolwezi (Kolwezi)
FC Renaissance du Congo (Kinshasa)
FC Saint-Éloi Lupopo (Lubumbashi)
FC Simba Kolwezi (Kolwezi)
JS Kinshasa (Kinshasa)
SM Sanga Balende (Mbuji-Mayi)
TP Mazembe (Lubumbashi)
US Panda B52 (Likasi)
US Tshinkunku (Kananga)

Champions
Champions so far were: 

1958: FC St. Eloi 
1963: CS Imana 
1964: CS Imana 
1965: AS Dragons 
1966: TP Mazembe 
1967: TP Mazembe 
1968: FC Saint Eloi Lupopo 
1969: TP Mazembe 
1970: AS Vita Club 
1971: AS Vita Club 
1972: AS Vita Club 
1973: AS Vita Club 
1974: CS Imana 
1975: AS Vita Club 
1976: TP Mazembe 
1977: AS Vita Club 
1978: CS Imana 
1979: AS Bilima 
1980: AS Vita Club 
1981: FC Saint Eloi Lupopo 
1982: AS Bilima 
1983: SM Sanga Balende 
1984: AS Bilima 
1985: US Tshinkunku 
1986: FC Saint Eloi Lupopo 
1987: TP Mazembe 
1988: AS Vita Club 
1989: DC Motema Pembe 
1990: FC Saint Eloi Lupopo 
1991: SCOM Mikishi
1992: US Bilombe 
1993: AS Vita Club 
1994: DC Motema Pembe 
1995: AS Bantous
1996: DC Motema Pembe 
1997: AS Vita Club 
1998: DC Motema Pembe 
1999: DC Motema Pembe 
2000: TP Mazembe 
2001: TP Mazembe 
2002: FC Saint Eloi Lupopo 
2003: AS Vita Club 
2004: DC Motema Pembe
2005: DC Motema Pembe 
2006: TP Mazembe 
2007: TP Mazembe 
2008: DC Motema Pembe 
2009: TP Mazembe 
2010: AS Vita Club 
2011: TP Mazembe 
2012: TP Mazembe 
2013: TP Mazembe 
2013–14: TP Mazembe 
2014–15: AS Vita Club 
2015–16: TP Mazembe 
2016–17: TP Mazembe 
2017–18: AS Vita Club 
2018–19: TP Mazembe
2019–20: TP Mazembe
2020–21: AS Vita Club
2021–22: TP Mazembe

Performance by club

Topscorers per season

See also
Linafoot Ligue 2

References

External links
soccerway.com; Standings, results and fixtures
League overview at fifa.com

 
1
Congo